Odostomia ziziphina is a species of sea snail, a marine gastropod mollusc in the family Pyramidellidae, the pyrams and their allies.

Description
The minute, white shell has a conic shape. The length is 0.65 mm. The protoconch is mammillated. The whorls of the teleoconch are marked by five spiral lirations of which two appear between the sutures, one at the periphery and two on the base. The columella has an oblique fold.

Distribution
The type specimen was found in the Pacific Ocean off Mazatlán, Mexico.

References

External links
 To World Register of Marine Species

ziziphina
Gastropods described in 1857